Hispar Pass or Hispar La (el. 5,128 m/16,824 ft) is a high-altitude, non-technical mountain pass in the Karakoram Range in Nagar District, Pakistan.

At the pass, the Biafo Glacier (63 km long) and Hispar Glacier (4
9 km long) meet at Hispar Pass to form the world's longest glacial traverse outside of the polar regions, 100 kilometers in length.

See also
Hispar Glacier
Biafo Glacier

References

External links
 Northern Pakistan detailed placemarks in Google Earth

Mountain passes of Gilgit-Baltistan
Mountain passes of the Karakoram